Richland Township is one of the sixteen townships of Belmont County, Ohio, United States. The 2010 census found 14,973 people in the township, 9,789 of whom lived in the unincorporated portions of the township.

Geography
Located in the central part of the county, it borders the following townships:
Wheeling Township - north
Colerain Township - northeast
Pease Township - east, north of Pultney Township
Pultney Township - east, south of Pease Township
Mead Township - southeast
Smith Township - south
Goshen Township - southwest
Union Township - west

The city of St. Clairsville is located in central Richland Township, and two unincorporated communities are located in the township: Bannock in the northwest, and Glencoe in the south.

Name and history
Richland Township was established in 1802. The name Richland is descriptive and refers to the fertility of their soil as well as the wealth of coal and limestone within the township's borders.
 
It is one of twelve Richland Townships statewide.

Government
The township is governed by a three-member board of trustees, who are elected in November of odd-numbered years to a four-year term beginning on the following January 1. Two are elected in the year after the presidential election and one is elected in the year before it. There is also an elected township fiscal officer, who serves a four-year term beginning on April 1 of the year after the election, which is held in November of the year before the presidential election. Vacancies in the fiscal officership or on the board of trustees are filled by the remaining trustees.

References

External links
County website

Townships in Belmont County, Ohio
Townships in Ohio
1802 establishments in the Northwest Territory